USS Iowa may refer to several vessels:

U.S. military vessels

Vessels named USS Iowa
 , a battleship that saw action during the Spanish–American War
 , a battleship already under construction when she was canceled by the Washington Naval Treaty
 , the lead ship of the  that saw action during World War II, the Korean War, and the Gulf War
 , a planned

Other vessels
 , 1838, a Mississippi River boat that transported troops during the American Civil War
 , a monitor that was never commissioned and was renamed Iowa before being sold
 USS Iowan (ID-3002), 1914 cargo ship used by the U.S. Navy in World War I for cargo and troop transport.

Non-military vessels named Iowa
 Maid of Iowa, 1842 steamboat 
 A stern-wheel rafter/packet named Iowa plied the Mississippi River from 1865–1900.
 A stern-wheel towboat named Iowa operated in the Mississippi River from 1921–1954; a contemporaneous dredge named Iowa also existed from 1932–1956.
 An ocean-going steamer named Iowa was in use in the late 19th century.
 In 1898 an excursion steamboat named Iowa was launched in Independence, Iowa, after several years as a popular attraction, it was carried over the Independence dam by high water and was demolished.

References

United States Navy ship names